Marc Canham may refer to:

 Marc Canham (footballer) (born 1982), English footballer
 Marc Canham (composer) (born 1977), British music composer